The 2002 Handball Championship was the third edition of the Oceania Handball Nations Cup, which took place at the Sleeman Centre in Brisbane, Australia from 5 to 7 July 2002. By winning, Australia secured the Oceania bid for the 2003 World Men's Handball Championship in Portugal. Participating nations were Australia, Vanuatu and the Cook Islands.

Standings

Results
All times are local (UTC+10).

References

External links
Report on Tudor Handball

Oceania Handball Nations Cup
2002 Oceania Handball Nations Cup
Oceania Handball Championship
2002 in Australian sport
Sport in Brisbane
July 2002 sports events in Australia